Massanes may refer to:
 Massanes, Catalonia, a municipality in Catalonia, Spain
 Massanes, Gard, a commune in the Gard department, France